Uncial 0265 (in the Gregory-Aland numbering), is a Greek uncial manuscript of the New Testament. Palaeographically it has been assigned to the 6th century.

Description 

The codex contains small parts of the Gospel of Luke 7:20-21,34-35, on one parchment leaf (27 cm by 22 cm). It is survived in a fragmentary condition. Probably it was written in two columns per page, 25 lines per page, in uncial letters.

Currently it is dated by the INTF to the 6th century.

Location 
Currently the codex is housed at the Berlin State Museums (P. 16994) in Berlin.

Text 
The Greek text of this codex is a representative of the Byzantine text-type, though text is too brief for certainty. Aland with some hesitation placed it in Category V.

See also 

 List of New Testament uncials
 Textual criticism

References

Further reading 

 Kurt Treu, "Neue Neutestamentliche Fragmente der Berliner Papyrussammlung", APF 18 (Berlin: 1966), pp. 23-38. 
 G. H. R. Horseley, "New Documents Illustrating Early Christianity" 2 (Macquarie University, 1982), pp. 125-140. 

Greek New Testament uncials
6th-century biblical manuscripts